Hedysarum sulphurescens, the yellow sweetvetch or white sweetvetch, is a perennial herb species.

Leucocyanidin reductase (LCR) uses 2,3-trans-3,4-cis-leucocyanidin to produce (+)-catechin and is the first enzyme in the proanthocyanidins (PA)-specific pathway. Its activity has been measured in leaves, flowers, and seeds of H. sulfurescens.

See also
 List of Canadian plants by family F

External links

References

Hedysareae